Turkey competed at the 2011 World Aquatics Championships in Shanghai, China between July 16 and 31, 2011.

Swimming

Turkey qualified 6 swimmers.

Men

Women

Synchronised swimming

Turkey has qualified 3 athletes in synchronised swimming.

Women

References

2011 in Turkish sport
Nations at the 2011 World Aquatics Championships
Turkey at the World Aquatics Championships